Cathedral School is a school established and administered by the Catholic Diocese of Lucknow, India, a religious and charitable society engaged in educational, medical and social work in eight districts of Lucknow. It is registered under the Registration of Societies Act No. XXI of 1860. The school is situated in the centre of Hazratganj. It is an unaided, co-educational, institution. A new system Of CCE is also implemented in the school for a continuous and a comprehensive evaluation of students. EduCom Smart Classes are also launched in primary classes of the school.

Early days

In 1858 a young Irish priest and catholic missionary William Gleeson came to Lucknow. He sold the land of the former mission at Golabganj, now in the state of Uttar Pradesh, and out of the proceeds and subscriptions raised from the public. He purchased a plot of land at Hazratganj which was then in the wilderness. In 1860 he built a Church and dedicated it to St. Joseph. This Church was blessed by Bishop Anastasius Hartmann on 10 May 1862. In the same year Rev. Fr. William Gleeson built a boundary wall and a priest's house in 1860–1862. He then handed over charge of the station to Rev. Fr. Felix O.F.M. Cap, of Turin.
In 1885 Norbert, O.F.M. Cap, of Tossignano began teaching two boys, Issac and Charles Claudius, on the verandah of the priest's house. He then established St. Francis School and orphanage. In 1890 he established St. Francis Boarding and Day School where the present Cathedral School exists. In 1908 the land where St. Francis School now stands was purchased by the Bishop of Prayagraj(then Allahabad) Petronius Gramigna O.F.M. Cap, In 1918 St. Francis School was shifted to its present location on 8, Shahnajaf Road. St. Joseph's Orphanage and St. Joseph's High School continued on the same premises of St. Joseph's Church.

Transformation to School
On 20 January 1942, Fr. Conrad De Vito, O.F.M Cap, was appointed the Parish Priest of St. Joseph's Church Lucknow. On 16 February 1947, he was consecrated the First Bishop of the new Diocese of Lucknow. The governor of U.P., Sir Francis Wylie extended full support and also attended the consecration and played an important role in the festivities that followed. In early 1950, Bishop Conrad expressed deep concern for the need of education for Catholics. He also founded Anand Bhawan School and Institute of the Maids of the Poor, another Catholic school in Barabanki city.
On 8 July 1950, St. Joseph's Private Day School was started with Fr. Edward Albertazzi O.F.M. Cap, as the Founder Principal with 60 children and four class rooms.
The school gets its name from the Cathedral Of St. Joseph.

Current situation
On 16 July 1952, due to a government notification earlier St. Joseph's Private Day School was renamed as Cathedral School with Very Rev.Fr. Clement Bondioli, O.F.M. Cap, as the second Principal for the succeeding five years. The school then consisted of eight to ten class rooms with 150 children on its roll. Initially the school was supposed to have just Christian students but was later changed to all religions,

The school has been upgraded to class XIIth level and is affiliated to the CBSE board.

Religious instruction is given to the Catholic students and moral education is given to the non-Catholics. English has been made the only language for conversation but Hindi is also used during Hindi periods. The institution conducts classes from Nursery to Class XII to preparing students for the Certificate Examination of the CBSE, New Delhi.

Controversies
On 3 December 2016, a boy named Lalit shot himself with his father's service revolver after the school principal and physical education teacher allegedly humiliated and beaten him after his bike accidentally ramped up with a rickshaw. His father later filed an FIR and the two accused were subsequently arrested.

In 2020 an ex-teacher filed an FIR against the school for discrimination based on religious after he asked for promotion but was instead removed.

Notable alumni 
 Sapan Saxena, Indian author, best known for his novels Finders, Keepers, UNNS-The Captivation & The Tenth Riddle
 Novoneel Chakraborty, Indian author and scriptwriter

References

External links
 http://www.cathedralschoollucknow.org/
 https://www.youtube.com/channel/UCezE9E4L5oP299vrvQy4ROg

Catholic schools in India
Primary schools in Uttar Pradesh
High schools and secondary schools in Uttar Pradesh
Christian schools in Uttar Pradesh
Private schools in Lucknow
1885 establishments in India
Educational institutions established in 1885